Yasue Maetake (born 1973 in Tokyo, Japan) is a New York City-based sculptor. Her work, in glass, among other materials, deals with the environment and nature's reaction to the man-made; it has been shown in Berlin, the Netherlands, the Czech Republic, Puerto Rico and in New York City, San Diego, Las Vegas, and Miami. Her exhibitions have been reviewed in Artforum, Flash Art, Art in America, Modern Painters, the New York Times, TimeOut New York, and Miami New Times.

In 2018, Artsy named her one of 20 female artists advancing the field of sculpture.

Education
She attended Toyama City Institute of Glass Art and Columbia University's MFA program.

References

1973 births
American contemporary artists
Japanese sculptors
American women sculptors
American sculptors
Glass artists
Women glass artists
Artists from New York (state)
Columbia University School of the Arts alumni
Living people
Japanese expatriates in the United States
Japanese emigrants to the United States
Artists from Tokyo
21st-century American women artists
American glass artists